Wakefield is a city in the metropolitan borough of the City of Wakefield, West Yorkshire, England.  In the city and surrounding area are 190 listed buildings that are recorded in the National Heritage List for England.  Of these, seven are listed at Grade I, the highest of the three grades, 18 are at Grade II*, the middle grade, and the others are at Grade II, the lowest grade.  Historically a market town, it was the chief wool market in Yorkshire in the 18th century, and in the 19th century the cattle market was the largest in the north of England.  The prosperity from this is reflected in the size of the parish church (now the cathedral), and in the large number of fine Georgian houses, many of which are listed.

Most of the listed buildings are houses and cottages and associated structures, shops and offices, banks, and public buildings.  Also listed are the cathedral, churches and associated structures, hotels and public houses, schools, bridges, and structures in public parks.  The River Calder, the Aire and Calder Navigation, and Calder and Hebble Navigation run through the south and east of the city, and items associated with them are listed.  The other listed buildings include the ruins of a castle, parts of a hospital and a prison, the base of a former pump, former almshouses, a milepost, former mill buildings, a theatre, a monument, a statue, a war memorial, and telephone kiosks.


Key

Buildings

References

Citations

Sources

 

Lists of listed buildings in West Yorkshire